Bradley "Brad" Jacobs (born August 3, 1956, in Providence, Rhode Island) is an American businessman. He is executive chairman of XPO Logistics, Inc., non-executive chairman of GXO Logistics, non-executive chairman of RXO, and managing director of Jacobs Private Equity, LLC.

Early life and education 
Jacobs was born in Providence, Rhode Island, the son of Charlotte Sybil (née Bander) (1929–2013) and Albert Jordan Jacobs (1927–2018). His father was a fashion jewellery importer. He graduated from Northfield Mount Hermon School and then went on to attend Bennington College and Brown University where he studied music and mathematics but dropped out in 1976 to take a job as an oil trader.

Career
Jacobs has created seven corporations, five of which are publicly traded: XPO Logistics and its spin-offs, GXO Logistics in 2021 and RXO in 2022; United Rentals; and United Waste Systems.

In 1979, Jacobs co-founded Amerex Oil Associates Inc., an oil brokerage firm. He served as Amerex's chief executive officer until the firm was sold in 1983.

In 1984, Jacobs moved to London and founded Hamilton Resources Ltd., an oil trading company.

In 1989, Jacobs founded United Waste Systems in Greenwich, Connecticut, and began consolidating small waste collection companies that had overlapping routes in rural areas. Jacobs served as chairman and chief executive officer, and in 1992 he took the company public. Jacobs sold United Waste Systems to USA Waste Services Inc. (now Waste Management, Inc.) for $2.5 billion.

In September 1997, Jacobs formed United Rentals, serving as the new company's chairman and chief executive officer. He took the company public three months later on the New York Stock Exchange  with the ticker symbol URI. Jacobs grew United Rentals through a strategy of consolidating equipment rental dealers in North America.

In 2011, Jacobs invested approximately $150 million in Express-1 Expedited Solutions, a third-party provider of transportation and logistics services that traded at the time on the American Stock Exchange as XPO. He assumed the roles of chairman of the board and chief executive officer, gained ownership of approximately 71 percent of the company, and renamed it XPO Logistics. Subsequently, Jacobs listed the company on the New York Stock Exchange, retaining the ticker symbol XPO.

In August 2021, XPO completed its spin-off of GXO Logistics, and Jacobs became non-executive chairman of GXO's board of directors. In November 2022, XPO completed its spin-off of RXO, and Jacobs became non-executive chairman of RXO's board of directors. In August 2022, Jacobs announced plans to step aside as CEO of XPO Logistics but remain executive chairman.

Personal life 
Jacobs is married to Lamia Jacobs, an oil trader originally from France; they have four children. Brad and his wife live in Greenwich, Connecticut.

References

20th-century American businesspeople
21st-century American businesspeople
American billionaires
American chief executives
American trucking industry businesspeople
Bennington College alumni
Brown University alumni
Businesspeople from Providence, Rhode Island
Northfield Mount Hermon School alumni
1956 births
Living people